January 1 - Eastern Orthodox liturgical calendar - January 3

All fixed commemorations below are observed on January 15 by Eastern Orthodox Churches on the Old Calendar.

For January 2nd, Orthodox Churches on the Old Calendar commemorate the saints listed on December 20.

Feasts

 Forefeast of the Theophany of Our Lord and Savior Jesus Christ.

Saints

 Saint Theodota, mother of the holy Unmercenaries Saints Cosmas and Damian (3rd century)
 Martyr Sergius, by the sword, at Caesarea in Cappadocia (301)
 Martyr Theopistus (Theopistos), by stoning.
 Hieromartyr Theogenes, Bishop of Parium on the Hellespont (c. 320)
 Saint Sylvester, Pope of Rome (335)  (see also December 31 - Latin Calendar)
 Martyr Basil of Ancyra, under Julian the Apostate (362)  (see also January 1 - Slavonic)
 Hieromartyr Isidore, Bishop of Syrian Antioch, by the Arians (4th century) 
 Saint Theopemtus, Monk.
 Saint Mark the deaf-mute.
 Saint Amun of Tabennisi, monk (4th century)  (see also October 4 - Greek)

Pre-Schism Western saints

 Martyrs Artaxus, Acutus, Eugenda, Maximianus, Timothy, Tobias and Vitus, in Syrmium in Pannonia (3rd–4th century)
 Martyrs of Rome, many martyrs who suffered in Rome under Diocletian for refusing to give up the Holy Scriptures (c. 303)
 Thousand Martyrs of Lichfield ('field of bodies') in England: 
 Hieromartyr Amphibalos and 999 others at Lichfield, under Diocletian (c. 303)
 Saint Martinianus of Milan (Maternian), Bishop of Milan in Italy, took part in the Third Oecumenical Council at Ephesus and wrote against Nestorianism (c. 435)
 Saint Aspasius of Auch, Bishop of Auch in France, took part in the Second, Fourth, and Fifth Councils of Orleans in 533, 541 and 549, besides holding a council in Auch in 551 (c. 560)
 Saint Schottin (Schotin, Scarthin), hermit of Kilkenny, Ireland (6th century)  (see also January 6)
 Saint Seiriol the Righteous, Abbott of Penmon Priory, brother of King Cynlas of Rhos and King Einion of Llŷn (6th century)  (see also February 1 - Latin Calendar)
 Saint Munchin the Wise (Mainchín of Limerick), probably the first Bishop of Limerick and also its patron-saint (late 6th century)
 Saint Blidulf (Bladulf), a monk at Bobbio Abbey in Italy who bravely denounced the heresy of the Lombard King Ariovald, an Arian (c. 630)
 Saint Vincentian (Viance, Viants), a disciple of St Menelaus, he became a hermit near Tulle in Auvergne in France (c. 730)
 Saint Adalard of Corbie (827)

Post-Schism Orthodox saints

 Saint Cosmas I of Constantinople the Wonderworker, Patriarch of Constantinople (1081)
 Saint Sylvester of the Kiev Caves (12th century)
 Righteous Juliana of Lazarevo (1604)
 New Martyr George (Zorzes, Zorsisus) the Georgian, at Mytilene (1770)
 Repose (1833) and Second Finding (1991) of the Relics of St. Seraphim of Sarov, Wonderworker of Sarov

New martyrs and confessors

 New Martyr Basil Petrov (1942)

Other commemorations

 Repose of Hieroschemamonk Gabriel of Optina and Whitehoof Convent (1871)
 Repose of Abbess Thaisia of Leushino Monastery (1915)
 Martyred Elder Ioasaph of St. Tikhon of Kaluga Monastery (1919)
 Repose of Elder Iakovos of Epirus (1961)

Icon gallery

Notes

References

Sources
 January 2/January 15. Orthodox Calendar (PRAVOSLAVIE.RU).
 January 15 / January 2. HOLY TRINITY RUSSIAN ORTHODOX CHURCH (A parish of the Patriarchate of Moscow).
 January 2. OCA - The Lives of the Saints.
 The Autonomous Orthodox Metropolia of Western Europe and the Americas (ROCOR). St. Hilarion Calendar of Saints for the year of our Lord 2004. St. Hilarion Press (Austin, TX). p.4.
 January 2. Latin Saints of the Orthodox Patriarchate of Rome.
 The Roman Martyrology. Transl. by the Archbishop of Baltimore. Last Edition, According to the Copy Printed at Rome in 1914. Revised Edition, with the Imprimatur of His Eminence Cardinal Gibbons. Baltimore: John Murphy Company, 1916. pp.3-4.
Greek Sources
 Great Synaxaristes:  2 ΙΑΝΟΥΑΡΙΟΥ. ΜΕΓΑΣ ΣΥΝΑΞΑΡΙΣΤΗΣ.
  Συναξαριστής. 2 Ιανουαρίου. ECCLESIA.GR. (H ΕΚΚΛΗΣΙΑ ΤΗΣ ΕΛΛΑΔΟΣ). 
Russian Sources
  15 января (2 января). Православная Энциклопедия под редакцией Патриарха Московского и всея Руси Кирилла (электронная версия). (Orthodox Encyclopedia - Pravenc.ru).
  2 января (ст.ст.) 15 января 2013 (нов. ст.) . Русская Православная Церковь Отдел внешних церковных связей. (DECR).

January in the Eastern Orthodox calendar